CIOR may refer to:

Interallied Confederation of Reserve Officers,
CIOR (AM), a radio transmitter in Princeton, British Columbia.